By the arrangements of the Canadian federation, Canada's monarchy operates in Quebec as the core of the province's Westminster-style parliamentary democracy and constitution. As such, the Crown within Quebec's jurisdiction is referred to as the Crown in Right of Quebec, His Majesty in Right of Quebec, or the King in Right of Quebec. The Constitution Act, 1867, however, leaves many royal duties in the province specifically assigned to the sovereign's viceroy, the lieutenant governor of Quebec, whose direct participation in governance is limited by the conventional stipulations of constitutional monarchy.

Constitutional role

The role of the Crown is both legal and practical; it functions in Quebec in the same way it does in all of Canada's other provinces, being the centre of a constitutional construct in which the institutions of government acting under the sovereign's authority share the power of the whole. It is thus the foundation of the executive, legislative, and judicial branches of the province's government. The —is represented and  duties carried out by the lieutenant governor of Quebec, whose direct participation in governance is limited by the conventional stipulations of constitutional monarchy, with most related powers entrusted for exercise by the elected parliamentarians, the ministers of the Crown drawn from among them, and the judges and justices of the peace. The Crown today primarily functions as a guarantor of continuous and stable governance and a nonpartisan safeguard against the abuse of power.

This arrangement began with the 1867 British North America Act and continued an unbroken line of monarchical government extending back to the early 16th century, making Quebec the oldest continuously monarchical territory in North America.

Upon the death of the monarch (known as the demise of the Crown), An Act Respecting the Demise of the Crown ensures that all activities of the provincial Parliament, Cabinet, courts, and employees of the Crown continue without interruption. This law was required because earlier legislation that attempted to remove all references to the monarchy in Quebec left a "legal vacuum".

There is currently no government house in Quebec. A viceregal suite in the André-Laurendeau building in Quebec City is used both as an office and official event location by the lieutenant governor, the sovereign, and other members of the Canadian royal family.

Royal associations

Those in the royal family perform ceremonial duties when on a tour of the province; the royal persons do not receive any personal income for their service, only the costs associated with the exercise of these official obligations are funded by both the Canadian and Quebec Crowns in their respective councils.

Monuments around Quebec mark some of those visits, while others honour a royal personage or event. Further, Quebec's monarchical status is illustrated by royal names applied regions, communities, schools, and buildings, many of which may also have a specific history with a member or members of the royal family; for example, Quebec has at least seven distinct features named for Queen Victoria, including the second largest area in Canada and Grand lac Victoria, at the head of the Ottawa River, south of Val-d'Or. Eleven locations and organizations are named for Victoria's father, Prince Edward, Duke of Kent and Strathearn. 

Gifts are also sometimes offered from the people of Quebec to a royal person to mark a visit or an important milestone; for instance, Queen Elizabeth II was in 1955 given the puck with which Maurice Richard scored his 325th career goal—thereby setting a new record—during a game against the Chicago Blackhawks on 8 November 1952.

Associations also exist between the Crown and many private organizations within the province; these may have been founded by a royal charter, received a royal prefix, and/or been honoured with the patronage of a member of the royal family. Examples include the Royal Montreal Curling Club, which was under the patronage of Prince Philip, Duke of Edinburgh, and received its royal designation from King George V in 1924, and McGill University, which was originally constituted as the Royal Institution for the Advancement of Learning through a royal charter from King George III in 1801, before being reconstituted as a university by George IV in 1827.

The main symbol of the monarchy is the sovereign himself, his image (in portrait or effigy) thus being used to signify government authority. A royal cypher or crown may also illustrate the monarch as the locus of authority, without referring specifically to the individual who is king or queen. Further, though neither the monarch nor  viceroy form a part of the constitutions of Quebec's honours, the latter do stem from the Crown as the fount of honour; unlike in all of Canada's other provinces, however, the insignia do not bear any royal emblems. Quebec lawyers may be appointed King's Counsel.

Popularity

Before the Quiet Revolution in the 1960s, when the distinction between the Canadian Crown and British imperialism was obscured by Quebec nationalism, the monarchy was relatively popular among Quebecers. The only moment when notable hostility was directed at the Crown was during the Lower Canada Rebellion, between 1837 and 1838, during which the republican rebels expressed personal animosity toward the young Queen Victoria.

Although Donald Mackenzie Wallace, the foreign correspondent for The Times, described a lack of "vigorous cheering" from the crowds in Quebec when Prince George, Duke of Cornwall and York (later King George V), and Princess Mary, Duchess of Cornwall and York (later Queen Mary), toured parts of the province in 1901, the French-Canadian media and nationalist organizations, such as the Saint-Jean-Baptiste Society, presented the royal couple with addresses of welcome. Prince George returned to Quebec seven years later, for the tercentennary of the founding of Quebec City; the events were so popular with Quebec residents that Prime Minister Wilfrid Laurier was led to opine that Quebecers were "monarchical by religion, by habit, and by the remembrance of past history."

During the 1939 royal tour by King George VI and his wife, Queen Elizabeth, Francophone newspapers emphasized that French-Canadians were loyal to the Canadian monarch, admired the King and Queen, and did not support British imperialism or view themselves as having assimilated into the British Empire.

Even at the start of the Quiet Revolution, when Queen Elizabeth II visited Quebec City in 1964 and open protest against the Crown was seen for the first time since the 1830s, the supporters far outnumbered the anti-monarchists; the New York Times reported there being between 50 and 100 student protesters, compared to the approximately 50,000 denizens who gave the Queen, as noted by the Montreal Gazette, "a tumultuous welcome". As the decade went on, the monarchy continued to receive support from some corners of Quebec, such as L'Action magazine asserting, “long before Ottawa was seized, as it is now, of the bilingual and bicultural ferment, the Crown was establishing the fact, in all its interventions in Canada, of equality of the two languages beyond the letter of the constitution.”

Today, few Quebecers support the monarchy in the province, with opinions of the general public varying from indifference to hostility.

The Société de la Couronne du Canada was founded in 2021 to fill a perceived void in support for the Canadian Crown in Quebec, though, the organization has national reach. Its aims are to provide a community for common support and the exchange of ideas; bolster the monarch, his family, and his viceregal representatives; protect Canadian heritage by way of defending the country's monarchy, including its history, customs, and symbols; and promote the Crown and Commonwealth.

Quebec nationalism and the sovereignty movement
In the first days of the royal tour of Canada by King George VI and Queen Elizabeth in 1939, which started in Quebec City, the French language newspaper La Presse took issue with the displays of British flags and decorations in Quebec, calling them "imperialistic propaganda". But, this was not anti-monarchical sentiment. Instead, the editorial board wanted for the King's presence to be a foundation for a celebration of Québécois culture, asking, "why don’t we, French Canadians, profit from the occasion to manifest our loyalty and attachment to our sovereigns, certainly, but also to our language, our nationality, our rights, our ethnic character. If we must have inscriptions, let them be worded in French. If we cheer, cheer in French."

Advocates of the Quebec sovereignty movement, which emerged in the 1960s, regard the Crown not as a distinct and essential part of the province's national structure—"the last bulwark of democracy," as former Liberal Prime Minister of Quebec Daniel Johnson Jr put it—but, as a federal institution involved in Quebec affairs; for them, the Canadian monarchy is a target of anti-federal, anti-English sentiment. Premier Daniel Johnson, head of the nationalist Union Nationale party, mused about making Quebec a federated republic. In an interview in 1971, René Lévesque, the then-leader of the province's sovereigntist political party, the Parti Québécois, was asked if there would be any role for the monarchy in an independent Quebec. He responded, "are you joking? Why? I have great respect for the Queen [...] But, what the Hell part should monarchy have in Quebec?" Parti Québécois leader Pauline Marois in 2012 called the lieutenant governor—the viceregal figure it was Marois' job to advise—a waste of money. University of Toronto professor Richard Toporoski held the theory that a sovereign, not independent, Quebec would still be under the sovereignty of the Canadian monarch: "the real problem of the Quebec bill is not separation from Canada: Quebec has said that it wishes to preserve common elements—Canadian currency (issued officially by whom?—the Queen of Canada), for example, and the possibility of Quebec citizens being Canadian citizens (and who are Canadian citizens?—subjects of the Queen)."

The Canadian monarchy is not recognized by most of those in the sovereignty movement, who refer to it instead still as the "British monarchy" or "English Crown", to play up on the narrative of the British conquest of New France in 1760, ignoring that Quebecers fought during the American Revolution and War of 1812 to stay under the Crown and that the flag of Quebec, which Parti Québécois leader Paul St-Pierre Plamondon said, "represents both the right of Quebecers to exist as a people and the province's democracy", employs French royal symbols.

Members of Canada's royal family have been asked by some Quebec sovereigntists to apologize for acts such as the Acadian Great Upheaval in the mid 18th century (which took place in Nova Scotia and the Crown recognised in 2003) and the patriation of the Canadian constitution in 1982. In 2009, the Saint-Jean-Baptiste Society's Montreal chapter asked Prince Charles to apologize for what it said was the royal family's role in  the "cultural genocide of francophones in North America over the last 400 years". The society did not make clear what, exactly, any member of the family had done to that end.

Sovereigntists have also been against the presence of members of the Canadian royal family in Quebec. At the height of the Quiet Revolution, the Quebec press reported that extreme separatists were plotting to assassinate Queen Elizabeth II during her upcoming 1964 tour of the province, as well as to kidnap Premier Jean Lesage's son, should the Queen come to Quebec. Despite fears for the monarch's safety and talk of cancelling the trip, the Queen arrived as planned and, in a speech delivered, in both French and English, to the Legislative Assembly on 10 October, spoke of Canada's two "complementary cultures" and the strength of Canada's two founding peoples. She stated, "I am pleased to think that there exists in our Commonwealth a country where I can express myself officially in French [...] Whenever you sing [the French words of] 'O Canada', you are reminded that you come of a proud race." Still, as her motorcade passed through Quebec City, the route was lined with Quebecers showing their backs to the monarch; others booed her and shouted separatist slogans. Though the protesters were the minority in the crowds gathered to see the Queen (newspapers reporting that those who opposed the visit were students numbering 100 or less in a crowd of 50,000), the provincial police violently dispersed those demonstrators who took to marching through the streets, arresting 36, including some who had been there to show loyalty to the Queen.

Lévesque later sent a letter to Buckingham Palace asking the Queen to refuse Prime Minister of Canada Pierre Trudeau's advice that she open the 1976 Summer Olympics in Montreal; though, she did not oblige the Premier, as he was out of his jurisdiction in offering advice to the sovereign on a federal matter. The prime minister at the time, Robert Bourassa, who had first pushed Trudeau to ask the Queen to attend, eventually himself became unsettled about how unpopular the move might be with sovereigntists.

Parti Québécois members of the National Assembly also complained in 2006 about federal intervention into a provincial affair and separatists threatened demonstrations after both the city and provincial governments mused about inviting the Queen or another member of the royal family to attend the festivities marking the quatercentenary of the founding of Quebec City, as had been done a century prior. Mario Beaulieu, then Vice-President of the Saint-Jean-Baptiste Society, stated, "you can be sure that people will demonstrate in protest [...] We are celebrating the foundation of New France, not its conquest. The monarchy remains a symbol of imperialism and colonialism. Her [the Queen's] presence will not be welcomed", and Gérald Larose, President of the Quebec Sovereignty Council, claimed the monarchy was, "the most despicable, appalling, anti-democratic, imperial, colonial symbol against which all social and individuals rights were obtained through the course of history", forgetting the Reign of Terror, slavery in the United States, Apartheid, and other iniquities committed by republics. Though it was met with dissatisfation from some officials in Quebec, but with support from 64% of polled individuals in the province, the federal government advised neither the sovereign nor any other royal family member to attend, instead sending Governor General Michaëlle Jean to preside over the fête.

The Saint-Jean-Baptiste Society and Réseau de Résistance du Québécois (RRQ) mounted demonstrations and threw eggs at Canadian soldiers during the visit of Prince Charles and Camilla, Duchess of Cornwall, to The Black Watch (Royal Highland Regiment) of Canada in Montreal, on Remembrance Day, 2009, requiring the intervention of riot police. The RRQ mounted similar, though less violent, protests when Prince William and Catherine, Duchess of Cambridge, visited Montreal and Quebec City in 2011.

In 2002, PQ Premier Bernard Landry directed the Executive Council and Lieutenant Governor to not recognize Elizabeth's Golden Jubilee, in protest of the Queen signing the Constitution Act, 1982; separatist demonstrators met the Queen when she entered Gatineau that year. Ten years later, in the Queen's Diamond Jubilee year, Marois proclaimed, "it doesn't bother me at all to attack royalty."  Following the death of Elizabeth II, the Premier, François Legault, was criticized by the PQ for having flags at Quebec Crown-owned properties lowered to half-staff.

The PQ has consistently, since 1970, resisted the Oath of Allegiance to the monarch of Canada, as the embodiment of the state order of laws and governance, which all parliamentarians across the country must, by the Canadian constitution, swear before being allowed to take their seats in the relevant legislature. In 1982, when the PQ had a majority in the National Assembly, the Act Respecting the National Assembly of Quebec was granted royal assent, adding a supplementary oath pledging loyalty to the undefined "people of Quebec". Forty years later, the recently elected PQ members of the Legislative Assembly, briefly joined by members of the equally separatist Québec solidaire party, refused to recite the oath, rendering them unable to take their seats in the provincial parliament. The legislature, with the nationalist Coalition Avenir Québec in the government benches, passed a law that attempted to amend the Canadian constitution to make the Oath of Allegiance optional for MNAs. It remains unclear if the law has any effect.

There has been push from Quebec parties for reforms: at a constitutional conference held in Ottawa in February 1968, delegates from Quebec indicated that a provincial president might suit the province better than the Queen and the lieutenant governor. But, the proposal was not accepted. Legault was asked in September 2022 whether the province should eliminate the office of the lieutenant governor. Legault expressed his awareness of  calls to "replace" the lieutenant governor before noting the matter was not a priority.

History

Pre-colonial
Aboriginal groups in what is today Quebec were considered by Europeans to belong to kingdoms—such as along the north shore of the St. Lawrence River, between the Trinity River and the Isle-aux-Coudres, and the neighbouring kingdom of Canada, which stretched west to the Island of Montreal—and the leaders of these communities, particularly those chosen through heredity, were referred to as kings.

The first French colonies

The monarchy that exists in Quebec today can trace its ancestral lineage back to the claims of King Henry VII in 1497 and King Francis I in 1534; both being blood relatives of the current Canadian monarch. While the first French colonies in North America were established at Acadia (today Nova Scotia) and Port Royal, French explorers thereafter exanded the King's territory inland and, in 1541, Jean-François Roberval was appointed as Viceroy of Canada, to represent King Henry IV. In 1608, Quebec City was founded and, seven years later, it was, on the recommendation of its founder, Samuel de Champlain, designated as a royal capital of the French empire in the Americas; Place Royale is named for the King. Champlain was installed in 1627 as the representative of the King in New France, making him the first in an unbroken line of viceroys ending at the incumbent governor general of Canada today.

Champlain surrendered on 16 July 1629 to the English privateer and friend of King Charles I, David Kirke, as, at the time, the population of New France was on the brink of starvation and neither man was aware that peace had already been reached between France, Scotland, and England in the Thirty Years' War. Upon learning that hostilities had ceased before Quebec's capture, Champlain argued that Kirke's seizure had been unlawful and, in 1632, Charles I agreed to return New France in exchange for King Louis XIII paying the dowry of Charles' wife, Queen Henrietta, which was specifically included in the Treaty of Saint-Germain-en-Laye. As a consolation, Kirke was knighted by Charles the following year.

Some six decades later, New France was designated by King Louis XIV as a royal province of France itself, ruled by the King through his appointed Conseil souverain, which included the governor general as the monarch's stand-in. One of the king's decrees, intended to augment, as well as level the gender imbalance of, the population of New France in the 1660s, was to send between seven and nine hundred women, known as the filles du roi (Daughters of the King), to the province, each with dowry, new clothing, and paid passage to the New World. As the population increased, infrastructure was built, such as the Chemin du Roi (King's Highway), between Montreal and Quebec City, and the Cathedral-Basilica of Notre-Dame de Québec, in the welfare of which the King took great interest. This type of French royal patronage extended through the 18th century; for example, from 1713 until 1758, Île-Royale was a project of King Louis XIV and King Louis XV, much of the financing for infrastructure—some 20 million livres—being provided by the monarchs (their names therefore appearing on such works).

Transfer to the British Crown

In the negotiations forming the Treaty of Paris in 1763, France relinquished New France in favour of its territory of Guadeloupe; King Louis XV found defence of the Canadian territory to be too much of a burden. It was with the signing of the treaty that the area that is today Quebec moved from under the sovereignty of the French Crown to that of the British Crown. However, King George III had previously allowed Catholicism within the laws of Great Britain and the Test Acts, which blocked Cathloics from governmental, judicial, and bureaucratic appointments, were relaxed in Quebec. Still, George faced the challenge of  persuading his French Catholic subjects to follow an English Protestant king.

As such, George issued the Royal Proclamation of 1763, which established an appointed colonial government and served as the basis for the constitution of the Province of Quebec until 1774. The King then, with the support of, and influenced by, his governor in the Province of Quebec, Guy Carlton (who had spent years convincing British officials to abandon their assimilationist policies), pushed for the passage of the Quebec Act in 1774, which was considered progressive for its time. Roman Catholics were granted religious and political freedoms that their compatriots in the United Kingdom would not have for another 50 years. French language rights were recognized and French civil law continued to apply in local disputes; British law was used only in criminal cases. This established the tradition of Canadian constitutional law protecting linguistic, religious, and legal rights in Quebec.

The American Revolution
The Royal Proclamation and Quebec Act were regarded by American colonists as two of the Intolerable Acts that were a catalyst for the American Revolution. But, the American hostility toward the spirit of those laws led most Québécois to reject the revolution; Quebec militiamen fought alongside British soldiers in repelling invasions by the republican revolutionaries and the residents of Montreal, which had fallen to General Richard Montgomery, did not take well to the American military presence, the Catholic clergy specifically asserting that the Quebec Act had given them what they wanted. Most of the peasant habitants, though, aided the Americans.

Also seeking the protection of the Crown, some 10,000 refugees—who became known as United Empire Loyalists—fled the Thirteen Colonies during, and the United States after, the conflict in order to settle in Quebec on land promised to them by the King-in-Council.

Prince William Henry (later King William IV) visited Quebec in 1787, while in the Canadas in charge of his frigate, . He travelled as far inland as Cornwall (in present-day Ontario). While there, the Prince encouraged the United Empire Loyalists to settle the region that later made up Upper Canada. Nearby, he also received a reception from members of the First Nations communities.

The residence of Prince Edward

One of King George III's sons, Prince Edward (the father of Queen Victoria), lived in Quebec City between 1791 and 1793, having requested a transfer from Gibraltar to the Canadian colonies, to act as colonel for the 7th Regiment of Foot. Upon Edward's arrival, Carlton, by then Governor General of the Canadas, used the Prince's status to ease the concerns of 40 First Nations chiefs who had travelled to Quebec City to complain about border incursions by the Americans, presenting Edward to the Indigenous leaders and proclaiming, "brothers! Here is Prince Edward, son of our King, who has just arrived with a chosen band of his warriors to protect this country." The Governor General then appointed Edward as second-in-command of the British forces in the colonies.

Edward became a part of society in Lower Canada, being able to associate with French Canadiens, Anglo elites, and United Empire Loyalist refugees from the United States, alike, and he toured much of the colony, visiting places such as Beauport, Fort Chambly, Lachine, and Ile aux Noix, and  occasionally spending holidays at Montmorency Falls. The Prince even had a French-Canadian mistress, Julie de Saint-Laurent, with whom it is thought he sired two children. Edward also became close with Louis d'Irumberry de Salaberry, his wife, Françoise-Catherine, and their four sons, including Charles de Salaberry; the Prince nurturing the young men's military careers. The Duke of Kent made certain to recognize Charles de Salaberry's leadership in the victory of the Canadian Voltigeurs over American invaders at the Battle of the Chateauguay, in the War of 1812, seeing that de Salaberry was appointed a Commander of the Order of the Bath.

After touring other parts of the Canadas in August 1791, Prince Edward returned to Quebec City in time to witness the proclamation of the Constitutional Act, which split the Province of Quebec into Upper and Lower Canada, and act as an observer for the election of the first Legislative Assembly of the latter, in Charlesbourg in June 1792. There, he witnessed a riot break out between two groups at the polling station and, in reaction, entreated the public, speaking in French, "I urge you to unanimity and concord. Let me hear no more of the odious distinction of English and French. You are all His Britannic Majesty's beloved Canadian subjects." It was the first  known use of the term Canadian to mean both French and English settlers in the Canadas. Edward also oversaw the establishment of the Cathedral of the Holy Trinity, a project of personal interest to his father, the King.

On the outbreak of the French Revolutionary War, Edward was promoted to major-general and ordered to the Caribbean in January 1794. He returned to the Canadas in the summer of the same year, but to Nova Scotia, staying there until just after the turn of the century.

The 19th century
British Prime Minister the Viscount Melbourne mooted in the 1820s and 1830s ideas of introducing greater democracy to Lower Canada, by way of devolving powers to the Legislative Council. This greatly alarmed King William IV, who feared it would lead to the loss of the colony, and, at first, he bitterly opposed these proposals. The King exclaimed to the Earl of Gosford, Governor General-designate of the Canadas, "mind what you are about in Canada [...] Mind me, my Lord, the Cabinet is not my Cabinet; they had better take care or, by God, I will have them impeached." Nevertheless, William approved his ministers' recommendations for reform.

Still, Louis-Joseph Papineau began agitating for Lower Canada to become a republic modelled on the United States. This concept spread trhough the colony and Queen Victoria, who had acceded to the throne in 1837, became a target of the revolutionaries' hostility. Rebellion broke out that year and were put down in 1838. As a mark of goodwill with which to begin her reign and to mark her coronation, the Queen used her royal prerogative to pardon many of the rebels and continued to do so through the 1840s.

The Queen's representative in British North America, the Earl of Durham, penned a report containing recommendations for change following the Lower and Upper Canada Rebellions. Based on that document, the Act of Union 1840 was passed by the parliament at Westminster and proclaimed in effect by Queen Victoria on 10 February 1841, thus renaming Lower and Upper Canada as Canada East (today Quebec) and Canada West (today Ontario), respectively, and merging them to form the Province of Canada, with a governor general to represent the monarch. Five years later, the Legislative Assembly of the Province of Canada, including elected representatives from both Canada East and Canada West, made Victoria's birthday, 24 May, a public holiday called Victoria Day.

At the Charlottetown and Quebec Conferences in 1864, prominent French-Canadian politicians, particularly Georges-Étienne Cartier, supported confederating the Canadian colonies into a self-governing constitutional monarchy. This was achieved with the passage of the British North America Act (today the Constitution Act), 1867, uniting Nova Scotia, New Brunswick, Canada West, and Canada East into the Dominion of Canada, with Canada East becoming the province of Quebec.

20th century

Prince George, Prince of Wales, was present for the celebration of Quebec City's tercentenary in 1908,

Ernest Lapointe, then the Minister of Justice and Attorney General of Canada in the Cabinet headed by Prime Minister William Lyon Mackenzie King, chaired the Canadian delegation involved in deliberations leading to the Statute of Westminster, 1931; a law that had support from a wide swath of Quebec's political elite, as it gave Canada its own crown and, consequently, control over its own foreign affairs and a distinction apart from the British Empire.

See also
 Oath of Allegiance
 Symbols of Quebec
 Monarchy

References

Quebec, Monarchy in
Government of Quebec
Westminster system